The Parliamentary Secretary to the Board of Education was a junior ministerial office in the United Kingdom Government. The Board of Education Act 1899 abolished the Committee of the Privy Council which had been responsible for education matters and instituted a new Board of Education from 1 April 1900. The Board was headed by a President. From the appointment of the Marquess of Londonderry as President in the Balfour government in August 1902 the post of Parliamentary Secretary to the Board was established. 

Under the provisions of the Education Act 1944, which was promoted by James Chuter Ede as Parliamentary Secretary (with Rab Butler as President) during the Churchill war ministry, the Board was in turn replaced by the Ministry of Education in August 1944. The post of Parliamentary Secretary to the Board was accordingly replaced by the Parliamentary Secretary to the Ministry of Education.  Chuter Ede remained in that position until the War coalition was dissolved in May 1945.

Parliamentary Secretaries to the Board of Education, 1902-1944

Lists of government ministers of the United Kingdom
Defunct ministerial offices in the United Kingdom